Poet Laureate of Philadelphia is a civic position in the City of Philadelphia.  The Poet Laureate has been described as an "Ambassador of Poetry". The holder of the position is expected to actively promote literacy and encourage expression in the city. As part of their position, they participate in service work, workshops and readings. One of their commitments is to mentor the Youth Poet Laureate of Philadelphia.  

The position was created by the City of Philadelphia during the city administration of Mayor Michael Nutter, and continued under Mayor Jim Kenney. It was originally managed by the city's Office of Arts, Culture and the Creative Economy.  As of 2017, administration of the program was transferred to the Free Library of Philadelphia.

Poets Laureate
The position of Poet Laureate of Philadelphia has a two-year duration, and is generally announced in January.
2012-2013 - Sonia Sanchez
2014-2015 - Frank Sherlock
2016-2017 - Yolanda Wisher
2018-2019 - Raquel Salas Rivera
2020-2021 - Trapeta Mason
2022-2023 - Airea D. Matthews

Youth Poets Laureate
The position of Youth Poet Laureate of Philadelphia has a one-year duration, corresponding roughly to the school year. It is often announced in June or July.  The Youth Poet Laureate receives mentoring from the Philadelphia Poet Laureate, and is encouraged to develop a "signature project that engages the public" during their year.
 2013-2014 - Siduri Beckman
 2014-2015 - Soledad Alfaro-Allah
 2015-2016 - David Jones
 2016-2017 - Otter Jung-Allen
 2017-2018 - Husnaa Hashim
2018-2019 - Wes Matthews
2019-2020 - Mia Concepcion
2020-2021 - 
2021-2022 - Andre'a Rhoads

References

Culture of Philadelphia
Phil